Mirza Ali Bahram Beygi (also Romanized as Mīrzā ʿAlī Bahrām Beygī; also known as Sartol (Persian: سرتل ) and Sar Tall and Sartol) is a village in Pataveh Rural District, Pataveh District, Dana County, Kohgiluyeh and Boyer-Ahmad Province, Iran. At the 2006 census, its population was 250, in 48 families.

References 

Populated places in Dana County